Lukas Ridgeston (born 5 April 1974) is a Slovak actor and director in gay erotic movies and model in Bel Ami gay erotic magazines and books. He was born in Bratislava, then part of the former Czechoslovakia, now capital of Slovakia. Lukas Ridgeston is best known as "The King of Gay Porn" or just "The King".

Career 
His stage name originated with the editors of Freshmen magazine. (It is common practice for magazines to assign names to photos of models, rather than the studios or the models themselves.) The magazine did not want to use a name from an Eastern Bloc country and chose the name "Lucas Ridgeston" as sounding more "Ivy League". BelAmi changed the spelling to "Lukas" and both have been used ever since.

Ridgeston performed nearly exclusively as a top in his films; however, he does bottom in the films Lukas' Story 2: When Boy Meets Boy and Lucky Lukas. (Lukas' Story and Lukas' Story 2 have since been combined and marketed as Lukas' Stories.)

When asked, "Do you identify as gay, straight or bi-sexual?", he replied, "I always say I am sexual".

Awards and recognition
1996 Adult Erotic Gay Video Awards (the "Grabbys") "Hot Shots" award with Cole Youngblood
1999 Ranked among the top 10 in Unzipped magazine's  "Best Erotic Video Performers of the Millennium"
2000 GayVN Awards Hall of Fame inductee
2002 Unzipped magazine reader's poll named him "Hottest Porn Star of All Time"
2006 GayVN Awards "Best Actor in a Foreign Release" for Lukas in Love 3
2015 Prowler British Awards Best International Porn Star

Selected videography
Boytropolis (aka A Man's World) (1993)
Lukas' Story Series of three films (1994–1995)
Frisky Summer 2: Sebastian (1996)
Lucky Lukas (1998)
All About Bel Ami (2001)
Lukas in Love Series of two films (2005)
Thinking XXX (HBO documentary, 2005)
The Private Life of Tim Hamilton (2006)
Forever Lukas (2013)

Books and print media
XXX: 30 Porn-Star Photographs—A photograph of Ridgeston was used for the back cover
Edition Euros 11: Photos of Lukas, photographed and published by the renowned photographer Bruno Gmünder in 1999.
Unzipped 100—The 100 Greatest Gay Porn Films Ever
Bel Ami Frisky Memories
Bel Ami: Intimate Friends
Bel Ami: Lukas in Love
Bel Ami: Next Generation
Edition Euros 11: Bel Ami—Photos of Lukas
The Films of George Duroy: Adam Gay Erotica
BelAmi 1997 Calendar
Together, the BelAmi 1998 Calendar
Perfect Moments, the BelAmi 2000 Calendar
Vogue-Homme International magazine, Spring-Summer 2001

Editor
101 Men Part 9 (2001)
101 Men Part 10 (2001)
101 Men Part 11 (2002)
101 Men Part 12 (2002)
Personal Trainers: Part 7 (2003)

See also

List of male performers in gay porn films

References
General

Specific

External links 

Living people
Actors from Bratislava
Actors in gay pornographic films
Slovak male pornographic film actors
1974 births
Slovak LGBT actors
Film people from Bratislava